Bahadur Singh Sagoo (born 7 May 1973) is an Indian former shot putter who competed in the 2000 Summer Olympics and in the 2004 Summer Olympics. He is a recipient of the civilian honour of Padma Shri.

References

External links
 

1973 births
Living people
Indian male shot putters
Olympic athletes of India
Athletes (track and field) at the 2000 Summer Olympics
Athletes (track and field) at the 2004 Summer Olympics
Athletes (track and field) at the 1998 Asian Games
Athletes (track and field) at the 2002 Asian Games
Asian Games medalists in athletics (track and field)
Asian Games gold medalists for India
Recipients of the Padma Shri in sports
Medalists at the 2002 Asian Games
Place of birth missing (living people)
Indian Sikhs